Nancy E. Rice (born June 2, 1950) is the former Chief Justice of the Colorado Supreme Court.

Life and education 
Rice was born on June 2, 1950 in Boulder, Colorado, and grew up in Colorado and Cheyenne, Wyoming. She received her Bachelor of Arts cum laude from Tufts University in 1972 and her J.D. from the University of Utah College of Law in 1975. She has one daughter.

Career 
After graduating from law school, Rice served as a law clerk for Judge Fred Winner of the United States District Court for the District of Colorado from 1975 to 1976. She then worked as an appellate state public defender from 1976 to 1977 before joining the U.S. Attorney's Office for the District of Colorado, where she served as the Deputy Chief of the Civil Division from 1985 to 1987. Rice became a judge on the Denver District Court in 1987, the same year she began teaching as an adjunct professor at the University of Colorado School of Law.

Service on Colorado Supreme Court 
Rice was originally appointed to the Colorado Supreme Court on August 5, 1998, by Governor Roy Romer and was subsequently elevated to Chief Justice on January 8, 2014. She retired from active service on June 30, 2018.

See also
List of female state supreme court justices

References

|-

Living people
Justices of the Colorado Supreme Court
1950 births
Politicians from Boulder, Colorado
Public defenders
S.J. Quinney College of Law alumni
Tufts University alumni
Women chief justices of state supreme courts in the United States
Assistant United States Attorneys
American women lawyers
20th-century American judges
21st-century American judges
Chief Justices of the Colorado Supreme Court
20th-century American women judges
21st-century American women judges
University of Colorado Law School faculty
American women academics